The Polish Handball Cup is an annual competition for handball clubs in Poland. It is overseen by 
the Polish Handball Federation. The tournament was established in 1959 and takes place every year (with a few exceptions, not held in: 1961, 1962, 1963, 1964, 1967, 1974, 1975, 1991, 2020).   

Orlen Wisła Płock are the current title holders, having beaten Łomża Vive Kielce in the 2022 final.

Winners
 The complete list of the Polish cup winners since 1959:

Total titles won

See also
 Polish Superliga

References

External links
 Polish Handball Federation website 

Handball competitions in Poland
1959 establishments in Poland